Thymus serpyllum, known by the common names of Breckland thyme, Breckland wild thyme, wild thyme, creeping thyme, or elfin thyme, is a species of flowering plant in the mint family Lamiaceae, native to most of Europe and North Africa. The oval evergreen leaves are 3–8 mm long. The strongly scented flowers are either lilac, pink-purple, magenta, or a rare white, all 4–6 mm long and produced in clusters. The hardy plant tolerates some pedestrian traffic and produces odors ranging from heavily herbal to lightly lemon, depending on the variety.

Description
Wild thyme is a creeping dwarf evergreen shrub with woody stems and a taproot. It forms matlike plants that root from the nodes of the squarish, limp stems. The leaves are in opposite pairs, nearly stalkless, with linear elliptic round-tipped blades and untoothed margins. The plant sends up erect flowering shoots in summer. The usually pink or mauve flowers have a tube-like calyx and an irregular straight-tubed, hairy corolla. The upper petal is notched and the lower one is larger than the two lateral petals and has three flattened lobes which form a lip. Each flower has four projecting stamens and two fused carpels. The fruit is a dry, four-chambered schizocarp.

Distribution and habitat
Wild thyme is native to the Palearctic realm of Europe and Asia. It is a plant of thin soils and can be found growing on sandy-soiled heaths, rocky outcrops, hills, banks, roadsides and riverside sand banks.
Wild thyme is one of the plants on which both the common blue butterfly and large blue butterfly larvae feed and it is also attractive to bees.

Chemistry

The oils of T. serpyllum contain thymol, carvacrol, limonene, paracymene, gamma-terpinene and beta-caryophyllene.

Cultivation
Creeping and mounding variants of T. serpyllum are used as border plants and ground cover around gardens and stone paths. It may also be used to replace a bluegrass lawn to xeriscape low to moderate foot traffic areas due to its tolerance for low water and poor soils.

Several cultivars have been produced, of which 'Pink Chintz' has gained the Royal Horticultural Society's Award of Garden Merit. A miniature creeping form is 'Elfin'.

Caring for creeping thyme is not hard, as long as it gets enough water and enough sun. Water deeply every 1-2 weeks. Make sure the soil stays evenly moist but not soggy - too much moisture can lead to root rot. Creeping thyme does best with 6-8 hours of direct or indirect sunlight each day.

Gallery

Illustrations

References

External links

'A Modern Herbal' (Grieves, 1931)
World Checklist

Creeping Thyme uses

Flora of France
Garden plants of Europe
Groundcovers
Herbs
Flora of Denmark
Flora of Estonia
Flora of Finland
Flora of Germany
Flora of Latvia
Flora of Lithuania
Flora of Norway
Flora of Russia
Flora of the United Kingdom
Medicinal plants
Plants described in 1753
Taxa named by Carl Linnaeus
serpyllum
Subshrubs